List of forests of South Africa, among other terms used it usually means "an area with a high density of trees" are wood, woodland, wold, weald and holt. Unlike forest, these are all derived from Old English and were not borrowed from another language.

List of Forests of South Africa

See also
 Forests of KwaZulu-Natal
 List of forests of the Eastern Cape
 List of forests of the Western Cape
 Protected areas of South Africa

South Africa geography-related lists
South Africa